Đỗ Thị Anh (born 9 February 1996) is a Vietnamese fencer. She won silver in the women's team foil event at the 2015 Southeast Asian Games and competed in the women's foil event at the 2016 Summer Olympics.

Anh started fencing when she was 15, after learning about the sport from the manga series Ore wa Teppei.

References

External links
 

1996 births
Living people
Sportspeople from Hanoi
Vietnamese female foil fencers
Olympic fencers of Vietnam
Fencers at the 2016 Summer Olympics
Place of birth missing (living people)
Southeast Asian Games medalists in fencing
Southeast Asian Games silver medalists for Vietnam
Competitors at the 2015 Southeast Asian Games
Fencers at the 2018 Asian Games
Asian Games competitors for Vietnam
Competitors at the 2019 Southeast Asian Games
Southeast Asian Games bronze medalists for Vietnam
21st-century Vietnamese women
20th-century Vietnamese women